Edin Bavčić (born May 6, 1984) is a retired Bosnian professional basketball player.

Professional career

Europe
Edin played for KK Bosna, which was the champion of the Bosnia and Herzegovina Basketball League in 2006.

At the beginning of the 2008–09 season, Bavčić joined TBL team Antalya Kepez Belediyesi but later in the season, he joined the Basketball Bundesliga team Köln 99ers. On June 10, 2009, he signed with Union Olimpija where he averaged 11.4 points and 6.3 rebounds per game in the Slovenian league, 5.7 points in the Adriatic League and 5.2 points and 4 rebounds at the Euroleague.

In 2011, he joined Aris BC, after having played for New Basket Brindisi, in Italy, and BC Khimik, in Ukraine.

In August 2011, he signed a one-year contract with Vanoli Cremona, however, they released him on December 6. The next day, he signed with Greek team KAOD.

On August 16, 2012, he signed with Limoges CSP where he averaged 2.3 points and 2.1 rebounds in 7 games. On November 22, he was released by Limoges. On December 4, he re-signed with KAOD.

On September 2, 2014, he signed with Sigal Prishtina.

On September 15, 2015, he signed with Sopron of the Hungarian League after averaging 17 points and 10 rebounds per game at Kosovo.

On August 17, 2016, he signed with Apollon Patras of the Greek Basket League.

On August 16, 2017, he signed with Klosterneuburg Dukes of the Austrian Bundesliga. Bavčić announced his retirement from professional basketball in June 2022.

NBA
In June 2006, he was selected by the Toronto Raptors with the 56th pick of the 2006 NBA draft.

On July 11, 2012, the New Orleans Hornets agreed to a three-team trade acquiring the rights for Bavčić, while sending Jarrett Jack to the Golden State Warriors and Darryl Watkins to the Philadelphia 76ers.

On January 21, 2014, the New Orleans Pelicans traded Bavčić's rights to the Brooklyn Nets for Tyshawn Taylor. On July 10, 2014, the Nets traded his rights to the Cleveland Cavaliers.

References

External links

 Eurobasket.com Profile
 FIBA.com Profile

1984 births
Living people
Apollon Patras B.C. players
Aris B.C. players
BC Khimik players
Bosnia and Herzegovina men's basketball players
K.A.O.D. B.C. players
KB Prishtina players
Kepez Belediyesi S.K. players
KK Olimpija players
Köln 99ers players
Limoges CSP players
New Basket Brindisi players
People from Foča
Power forwards (basketball)
Soproni KC players
Toronto Raptors draft picks
Vanoli Cremona players
Xion Dukes Klosterneuburg players